INTACT is the first Romanian media group based entirely on a private local business. A considerable number of the most important propaganda brands in the audio-visual and print industry have been launched under this umbrella since its first product, Intact Printing House, was established in 1991.

The Intact Media Center headquarters, at Gârlei Street, no. 1B, were seized by the state on Friday, 8 August 2014, as a result of the judgement sentencing Dan Voiculescu, the founder of Intact Media Group, to ten years of imprisonment. The journalists of the broadcasting company Antena 3 CNN, part of the Intact Media Group, have been conducting investigations on high-profile political leaders and unveiling multiple corruption cases under the Romanian politicians. One example is the former president of Romania, Traian Băsescu, who, together with his brother, Mircea Băsescu, was accused of taking bribes in order to influence justice. Mircea Băsescu was sentenced to four years' imprisonment on 8 January 2016.

The channels that the company owns are: Antena 1, Antena Stars, Antena 3 CNN, Happy Channel, ZU TV.

Member companies 
As of January 2020, the companies that are part of the Intact group are:

Television 
 Antena 1
 Antena Stars formerly known as Antena 2
 Antena 3 CNN
 Happy Channel formerly known as Euforia lifestyle TV
 Antena Internațional also called/known as Antena 5
 ZU TV formerly known as GSP TV

 Print 
 Jurnalul Național Online 

 spynews.ro
 a1.ro

 Radio 
 Romantic FM Radio ZU B2B 
 Intact Production Tipografia Intact Intact Media Academy Seed Consultants Branding & Design Formerly 

 Gazeta Sporturilor (until 2018)Income MagazineBBC Good FoodBBC Science FocusBBC Top GearThe Industry''
Online Media - Your Voice -(Dubbing animations)

References

External links

Mass media in Romania
Mass media in Bucharest
Television networks in Romania